The Type 205 was a class of German diesel-electric submarines. They were single-hull vessels optimized for the use in the shallow Baltic Sea. The Type 205 is a direct evolution of the Type 201 class with lengthened hull, new machinery and sensors. The biggest difference though is that ST-52 steel is used for the pressure hull since the Type 201's non-magnetic steel proved to be problematic. Type 206, the follow-on class, finally succeeded with non-magnetic steel hulls.

The Type 205 was in service with the Royal Danish Navy until 2004, in which it was known as Narhvalen class. The Danish boats differed slightly from the German ones to meet special Danish demands. Responsible for the design and construction was the Ingenieurkontor Lübeck (IKL) headed by Ulrich Gabler.

List of boats

These last two boats were built by the Howaldtswerke, in Denmark at The Naval Dockyard, Copenhagen.

Notes:
 U-1 was given back to Nordseewerke and was used to test an experimental closed-cycle diesel air-independent propulsion system before being scrapped
 U-11 was transformed to a Type 205A double-hulled boat (the outer hull filled with polystyrene foam to make it unsinkable) and used as torpedo target
 U-12 was used for sonar trials as Type 205B

References

See also

 Kobben class submarine

External links
 Submarines of the Narhvalen class - Danish Naval History